Dion Louise Aroner (born June 6, 1945) is a Democrat who represented California's 14th Assembly District, including parts of Alameda and Contra Costa counties, from December 6, 1996, to November 30, 2002. She also lost in a special election primary to Don Perata for the 9th District Senate seat in 1998. She currently owns her own lobbying firm with two of her former staffers. Since leaving the Assembly, Aroner has also been part of the legislator-in-residence program at the University of California, Berkeley. Prior to serving in the Assembly, Aroner served as the Chief of Staff to her predecessor Tom Bates from 1972 until 1996. Bates is also the husband of Aroner's successor, Loni Hancock.

Currently, Dion Aroner works as a public relations consultant for businesses and organizations that are interested in purchasing access to government officials, lobbying, and other legislative and policy influencing strategies.

References

 

1944 births
Living people
Members of the California State Assembly
People from Alameda County, California
Women state legislators in California
21st-century American politicians
21st-century American women politicians